Eucraera magna is a species of Lasiocampidae moth, it is known from Sierra Leone and Eritrea.

Taxonomy
Some authors also count Eucraera minor  (Gaede, 1915) as a synonym of Eucraera magna.

References
Aurivillius 1909a. Diagnosen neuer Lepidopteren aus Afrika 9. - Arkiv för Zoologi 5(5):1–29

External links
Africanmoths: pictures of Eucraera magna
Picture on Flickr

Lasiocampidae
Moths described in 1909
Moths of Africa